Romenay is a commune in the Saône-et-Loire department in the region of Bourgogne-Franche-Comté in eastern France.

It is a pretty medieval town surrounded by ancient walls with its typical church at the centre of town.

See also
Communes of the Saône-et-Loire department

References

Communes of Saône-et-Loire
Bresse